Cham Sorkh may refer to:
 Cham Sorkh, Ilam
 Cham Sorkh, Kermanshah